Luigi "Gigi" Samele (born 25 July 1987) is an Italian left-handed sabre fencer, three-time team European champion, two-time Olympian, and three-time Olympic medalist.

He is dating Ukrainian fencer Olha Kharlan.

Medal Record

Olympic Games

World Championship

European Championship

Grand Prix

World Cup

References

External links
 

1987 births
Living people
Italian male fencers
Italian sabre fencers
Olympic fencers of Italy
Fencers at the 2012 Summer Olympics
Fencers at the 2020 Summer Olympics
Olympic silver medalists for Italy
Olympic bronze medalists for Italy
Olympic medalists in fencing
Medalists at the 2012 Summer Olympics
Medalists at the 2020 Summer Olympics
Universiade medalists in fencing
Mediterranean Games gold medalists for Italy
Mediterranean Games medalists in fencing
Competitors at the 2013 Mediterranean Games
Universiade silver medalists for Italy
Universiade bronze medalists for Italy
Sportspeople from Foggia
Fencers of Fiamme Gialle
Medalists at the 2009 Summer Universiade
20th-century Italian people
21st-century Italian people
World Fencing Championships medalists